General elections were held in Northern Rhodesia on 20 and 21 January 1964. There were two voter rolls for the Legislative Council, a main roll that elected 65 seats, and a reserved roll that elected 10. Africans elected the main roll, whilst Europeans elected the reserve roll. Other ethnicities were allowed to choose which roll to be part of. The United National Independence Party won the elections, taking 55 of the common roll seats. Its leader, Kenneth Kaunda became Prime Minister, leading the country to independence in October that year, at which point he became President. Voter turnout was 94.8% for the main roll and 74.1% for the reserved roll.

Background
The Northern Rhodesian African National Congress (NRANC) sought to delay the elections, claiming that twelve of its candidates had been prevented from registering, and its request for the nomination process to be extended was granted. NRANC leader Harry Nkumbula claimed that failure to postpone the elections would lead to "passive resistance" and that any violence would be "the entire responsibility of the Governor and his officers." The election date was also criticised by the People's Democratic Congress, which claimed that good weather during the month would encourage people to do farmwork rather than go out to vote. It also criticised the registration process, claiming that some people had to walk over 30 miles in order to register to vote.

Campaign
UNIP contested all 10 reserved roll seats, putting up candidates including former Liberal Party leader John Moffat and ex-minister Charles Cousins.

UNIP won 24 of the 75 common roll seats unopposed, whilst the NRANC also had five members returned unopposed, although all of them defected to UNIP.

Conduct
Seven people were killed in the Chinsali area by members of the Lumpa Church sect, who were trying to prevent people from joining political parties. Following reports of violence, Kaunda flew to the area to attempt to broker a truce.

The election campaign also saw clashes between NRANC and UNIP supporters, with two UNIP members killed. Fighting between the two in Mufulira in mid-January had to be broken up with tear gas, whilst two children were killed near Fort Jameson when a house inhabited by NRANC supporters was burned down.

Results

Aftermath
A new UNIP-led government was sworn in shortly before the end of January. Governor Evelyn Dennison Hone retained responsibility for foreign affairs, defence and policing.

See also
List of members of the National Assembly of Zambia (1964–68)

References

1964 in Zambia
Elections in Zambia
Northern Rhodesia
Northern Rhodesia